Tin Roof is the seventh studio album by Canadian country music artist Gord Bamford. It was released on April 8, 2016 by Cache/Sony Music Canada. It includes the singles "Don't Let Her Be Gone", "Heard You in a Song", "Breakfast Beer" and "Fall in Love If You Want To".

Track listing

Chart performance

Album

Singles

References

2016 albums
Gord Bamford albums
Sony Music Canada albums
Canadian Country Music Association Album of the Year albums